La Otra (English: The Other Woman) is a Mexican telenovela produced by Ernesto Alonso for Televisa in 2002. It aired on Canal de las Estrellas from May 20 to September 20, 2002. The telenovela stars Juan Soler, Yadhira Carrillo, Jacqueline Andere and Sergio Sendel.

This telenovela was a moderate success in Mexico, airing at 8pm in the summer of 2002, right before the (usually) highest-rated hour of 9pm. It has also grown in popularity amongst telenovela fans of all kinds, thus making it a cult classic of sorts. La Otra was awarded the TVyNovelas Award for Best Telenovela of the Year in 2003.

Plot
On a dark, stormy night, Bernarda (Chantal Andere), Leopoldo b Guillen's lover, takes her two small daughters, Eugenia (Mercedes Molto) and Carlota (Yadhira Carrillo), to his funeral. Leopold's son, Roman, his wife, and the priest tell them that they are unwelcome at the funeral and Román (Alejandro Ávila) throws them out in the mud.

Years later, Carlota and Eugenia are attending a university where Carlota studies music and Eugenia studies accounting. Bernarda favors and expects the best out of Eugenia, who is failing school. However, she disdains and expects the worst out of Carlota, whom Bernarda calls "inutil" (good-for-nothing).

In reality, Carlota is the one who is successful, as she plays the piano beautifully and paints many masks, showing us that she has quite the artistic side. Bernarda is a materialistic woman, determined to never allow her daughters to marry in order to avoid what is stated in the father's will: Upon marriage, they will take their part of the fortune.

She oppresses the girls and holds them near prisoner in their own home. However, Carlota and Eugenia do not allow circumstances to stop them from being their own selves. Eugenia is secretly dating Roman and has already had relations with him. Roman has slept with her for vengeance only.

He thinks that she is his half-sister. However, she is not Leopoldo's daughter. When Bernarda and Carlota discover that Eugenia is pregnant, Bernarda sends her away to a small town with their housekeeper (Tomasa Josefina Echánove). In the small town Eugenia meets Cordelia (Yadhira Carrillo), who is identical to Carlota.

She also meets Santos (Ignacio Guadalupe), a man who falls in love with her; and they marry in order to give her child a name. Meanwhile, Carlota forms a relationship with a young doctor named Álvaro (Juan Soler). He soon asks for her hand in marriage. When Bernarda finds out, she adamantly opposes and unsuccessfully tries break them up via many means.

Eventually, she concedes and gives Carlota her blessing. Of course, knowing Bernarda, there is always an ulterior motive. Eugenia gives birth but because Bernarda tells Eugenia the entire truth about everything that has happened, she instigates her own daughter's early death.

During her last moments, Eugenia orders Tomasa to hide the baby with Santos and lie to everyone and say the baby died. Eugenia curses her mother with misery and guilt and dies. When Eugenia's body is delivered to Bernarda, Álvaro asks to see Carlota, but Bernarda demands that he leave and leave her to mourn her daughter's death.

Ignorant of recent happenings and of the fact that Carlota has a sister, Álvaro believes Carlota died. Bernarda does not correct him and says that Carlota died in a freak accident. She denies him access to view the dead body by lying (The lie is that Carlota's body is unrecognizable from the serious degree of the accident).

Álvaro leaves for his parents' hacienda in a rural town to get over his first (and only) love. Bernarda tells Carlota that he abandoned her and that he was just using her.  With the death of her sister and this terrible news, Carlota tries to kill herself, but she only kills her unborn child.

During Alvaro's grieving process, Cordelia eventually seduces Álvaro into a loveless marriage, using her appearance and her charismatic manipulation skills to her advantage. Ten years later, Carlota is nothing more than a mere shadow of her former self, further enslaved by Bernarda, and Álvaro and Cordelia are having marital troubles, causing misery for their daughter Natalia.

Eventually, Carlota will learn to break free and become her own person...but it will take walking into the lion's den to do so. She will go to Alvaro's house and assume the position of La Otra.

Cast
 
Yadhira Carrillo as Carlota Guillén Sáenz / Cordelia Portugal Sánchez de Ibáñez
Juan Soler as Álvaro Ibáñez Posada
Jacqueline Andere as Bernarda Sáenz Rivas Vda. de Guillén
Sergio Sendel as Adrian Ibáñez Quevedo
Manuel Ojeda as Juan Pedro Portugal
Alejandro Ávila as Román Guillén Caballero / Raúl Guízar
Eugenio Cobo as Father Agustín
Jorge Vargas as Delfino Arriaga
Julio Bracho as Lázaro Arriaga
Toño Mauri as Daniel Mendizábal
Azela Robinson as Mireya Ocampo Herrera
Rosa María Bianchi as Lupita Ibáñez
Maty Huitrón as Fabiana Morales Rivas
Mercedes Molto as Eugenia Guillén Sáenz
Josefina Echánove as Tomasa López
Alonso Echánove as Refugio Ríos "Cuco"
Luis Couturier as Justo Ibáñez
Sergio Sánchez as Santiel Orozco
Verónica Jaspeado as Apolonia Portugal Sánchez
Lupita Lara as Matilde Sánchez de Portugal
Ignacio Guadalupe as Santos Mérida
Roberto Antúnez as Father Fermín
Elsa Cárdenas as Paulina Caballero Vda. de Guillén
Zoila Quiñones as Simona Díaz
María Prado as Martina Rubio
Antonio de la Vega as Isaac Gómez
Carlos González Benigno Mérida
Rosángela Balbó as Socorro
Thelma Dorantes as Carmen
Ofelia Guilmáin as Sabina Herrera Vda. de Ocampo
Sergio Ramos "El Comanche" as Don Joaquín Pardo
Isadora González as Camila Mendizábal
Virginia Gutiérrez as Esperanza
Marco Muñoz as Fulgencio Ríos
Gastón Tuset as Dr. Salvador Almanza
Alfonso Iturralde as Narciso Bravo
Virginia Gimeno as Hilaria Rivero
Shirley as Julieta de Guillén
Natasha Dupeyrón as Natalia Ibáñez Portugal
Carlos Speitzer as Librado Mérida Guillén
Esther Guilmáin as Esther
Erika Blenher as Roberta
Mónika Sánchez as Regina Salazar Rubio
Macaria as Fátima Rubio de Salazar
Juan Peláez as Enrique Salazar
Ronny Montemayor as Raul Salazar
Cosme Alberto as Braulio Portugal Rivero
Annie Del Castillo as Karen Mendizábal
Constanza Mier as Aída
Chantal Andere as Young Bernarda Sáenz
Carolina Guerrero as Jovita
Enrique Hidalgo as Isidro
Hugo Macías Macotela as Notario Carballido
Silvia Manríquez as Young Marta Caballero de Guillén
David Ramos as Father Conrado
Alberto Inzúa as Father Javier
Lucy Tovar as Celina Chávez
José Montini as Animador
María Dolores Oliva as Flor
Juan Romanca as Belarmino
Ricardo Vera as Genaro
Ofelia Cano as Diana Herrera
Jairo Gómez as Cristóbal Ocampo

Awards and nominations

References

External links

2002 telenovelas
Mexican telenovelas
2002 Mexican television series debuts
2002 Mexican television series endings
Spanish-language telenovelas
Television shows set in Mexico
Televisa telenovelas